Hong Byung-hee is a professor of the department of chemistry at Seoul National University. Hong has developed the method of synthesizing large-scale graphene by chemical vapor deposition (CVD), which triggered chemical researches toward the practical applications of graphene. His papers reporting the large-scale growth of graphene have been intensively cited by many graphene researchers, showing the originality and the significance of his research.

Graphene, the world thinnest material combines seemingly mutually exclusive material properties, which are of great importance for the flexible transparent conducting electrode market: it is at the same time both the best electric conductor we know and yet optically almost transparent; it is the world's strongest material and yet extremely flexible/bendable. Since its discovery in 2004 it has revolutionized our understanding of two dimensional crystals and their potential for device applications. The rapid development of graphene research and its impact on material science culminated Nobel Prize in Physics in 2010 for its discovery. Hong's contribution in large-area graphene synthesis has been recognized by Nobel committee, which is being exhibited in Nobel Museum.

The unique electronic properties of this two dimensional carbon sheet are also of great interest to the semiconductor industry and have received considerable attention from leading high tech companies such as IBM, SAMSUNG, LG, Nokia, Google and Apple. Here, its potential for ultrafast transistors, energy storage and in particular flexible transparent conducting electrodes for, e.g. foldable touch screen panels generate most of the excitement. From a purely application point of view the key breakthrough took place in 2010: The founder of GSI have invented an  industry compatible growth (CVD) and transfer (Roll-to-Roll) process enabling the large scale synthesize of graphene for commercial applications. The related key patents have been registered in Korea, US, Japan, and China.

Hong is also the founder of GSI pioneered the large-scale synthesis of graphene by chemical vapor deposition (CVD), which triggered chemical research toward the practical application of graphene. His first report on CVD synthesis of graphene (Nature 2009) has recorded the world highest citations in chemistry among the papers published since 2009 (roughly 5000 times). One year later, he developed the synthesis of ultra-large graphene based on roll-to-roll methods and its application to flexible touch screens (Nature Nanotechnology. 2010), which is believed to be the first demonstration of application of graphene materials in practical electronic devices. For this contribution, he was invited to give a talk in the Nobel Symposium on Graphene (2010). He made more than 90 patent applications on graphene synthesis and applications, which corresponds to the world 2nd graphene-related inventor. Hong's research has been highlighted by Bloomberg, Businessweek, BBC, CNBC, New York Times, Financial Times, Russia Today, MIT Technology Review, C&EN News (cover story), Physics Today, and Physics World. He is now acting as Scientific Advisory Committee member of €1 billion  Graphene Flagship project together with 4 Nobel Laureates and as Scientific Advisory Member of Cambridge Graphene Center, UK. He is currently an Advisory Member for CTO of LG Electronics. He served as a member of R&D Strategy and Planning Committee for Korean National Graphene Commercialization Project.

Education
 2002 : Ph.D., Chemistry, Pohang University of Science and Technology
 2000 : M. S., Chemistry, Pohang University of Science and Technology
 1998 : B. S., Chemistry, Pohang University of Science and Technology

Work
2017 : Professor, Department of Chemistry, College of Natural Sciences, Seoul National University
2011 : Associate Professor, Department of Chemistry, College of Natural Sciences, Seoul National University
2007~2011 : Assistant Professor, Department of Chemistry and Sungkyunkwan Advanced Institute of Nanotechnology (SAINT)

Awards
2009: POSCO Cheong-Am Bessemer Fellowship, TJ Park Foundation
2010: SKKU Young Fellowship, Sungkyunkwan University
2010: Joong-Ang Daily - Yumin Award of Science			
2011: Kyung-Ahm Prize of Natural Science
2012: Excellent Researcher Award (Korean Chemical Society)
2012: Creative Knowledge Award (Ministry of Education, Sci. and Tech.)

Representative Publications
2001 :  
2001 :  
2005 :  
2006 :  
2009 :  
2009 :  
2010 :  
2010 :

References

Seoul National University
South Korean chemists
Living people
1971 births